Patricia Bernal (born 27 October 1961) is a Mexican actress. She has appeared in more than twenty films and telenovelas including Pobre rico, pobre. Her sons Gael (whose father is José Ángel García) and Darío (whose father is Sergio Yazbek) are also actors. She also has a daughter, Tamara Yazbek Bernal.

Selected filmography

References

External links 

1961 births
Living people
Mexican actresses